Norm Leverton (9 October 1924 – 7 January 2009) was a former Australian rules footballer who played with Melbourne in the Victorian Football League (VFL).

Notes

External links 		

		
		
		
1924 births		
2009 deaths		
Australian rules footballers from Victoria (Australia)		
Melbourne Football Club players